Temple City, officially the City of Temple City, is a city in Los Angeles County, California located northeast of downtown Los Angeles and at the base of the San Gabriel Mountains. Temple City is part of a cluster of cities, along with Pasadena, Arcadia, Alhambra, San Marino, and San Gabriel, in the west San Gabriel Valley.

Temple City was ranked as the 5th safest city to live in California.

History
The town of Temple originated on May 30, 1923, when Walter P. Temple (June 7, 1870 – November 13, 1938) purchased  of land four miles (6 km) east of San Gabriel which had been part of Lucky Baldwin's Rancho Santa Anita. The original townsite (Tract 6561, recorded with the LA County Tax Assessor in June 1923) corresponds to the present-day area bounded by Garibaldi Avenue on the north, Baldwin Avenue on the east, Live Oak Avenue on the south, and Encinita Avenue on the west.

Temple, the son and tenth child of Pliny Fisk Temple and William Workman's daughter Antonia Margarita Workman, was born on Rancho La Merced, which is today part of the city of Montebello. This was the site of the original San Gabriel Mission, founded by the Franciscan Fathers next to the rich bottom lands of the San Gabriel River. Historically called "Rio de los Temblores", which means the River of the Earthquakes, it is today known as the Rio Hondo River.

Temple envisioned building a community where average people could afford to live and own their homes. He then divided the area into lots and laid out the park facing Las Tunas Drive. He named other streets after friends and family: Workman, Kauffman, Rowland, Temple and Agnes. Bond issues initiated by Temple were responsible for street paving and electricity. Temple also petitioned the Pacific Electric Railway Company to extend its Los Angeles to Alhambra line to a depot adjacent to Temple City Park. The extension of the railway contributed to the steady growth of Temple City, and is commemorated by statues of railcar passengers along Rosemead Boulevard.

In 1925, the Women's Club of Temple City was founded.

City name
The town was originally named "City of Temple" after its founder, Walter Temple, but the United States Postmaster General Harry Stewart New demanded a name change in 1926 because the mail was accidentally being directed to the Phoenix suburb of Tempe. It was officially designated "Temple City" but remained a city in name only until after the post–World War II population explosion followed by incorporation on May 25, 1960, which resulted in the redundant name: "City of Temple City".  (This redundancy is shared with other cities in California, such as the City of California City.) Merrill Fitzjohn, the  founder and original owner of Fitzjohn Jewelers on Las Tunas Drive, was appointed as the city's first mayor.

2009 Temple City Affair
In January 2009, the Los Angeles County District Attorney began investigating allegations that Temple City's mayor, Judy Wong, along with city council members David Capra, and former mayor Cathe Wilson solicited bribes in exchange for support of the proposed $75 million Temple City Piazza mall project and both women were charged with lying on fair political practice commission disclosure forms. Randy Wang, developer of the Piazza project, made allegations that Wong, Wilson and Councilman David Capra demanded and received cash bribes for their support of the development. Wang raised the allegations as part of his counter-suit against the city, which sued him in April 2008, claiming he failed to meet contractual deadlines of construction on the  Piazza project. Temple City's lawsuit asks that the property, at Las Tunas Drive and Rosemead Boulevard, be returned to the city because of the delays after two groundbreaking ceremonies.

Wong, 55, the city's first Asian council member, was elected in 2003, was re-elected in 2007, and served as the city's first Asian mayor in 2007. Capra pleaded guilty to one misdemeanor count of failure to report a campaign contribution and agreed to resign as a condition for no prison time. Nine months after being indicted on charges of bribery and perjury, Wong resigned from office in March 2010; Wilson was voted out of office in spring 2009. In May 2010, Wong accepted a plea agreement of no contest for 10 counts of bribery and perjury. Wong served a 16-month sentence at Chowchilla after pleading no contest to 10 felony counts of bribery, solicitation of bribery and perjury, and she is required to pay $16,700 in restitution to developer Randy Wang. She will have to pay about $16,300 in fines and fees. The judge denied a request from Wong's attorney seeking probation for the one-time politician.

Cathe Wilson was charged with three counts each of perjury and bribery. The perjury charges included one count of lying to the Los Angeles County Grand Jury in 2008 and two counts of submitting false material in Fair Political Practices reports. Although she maintains her innocence, she chose not to plea, and her case was continued. On March 30, 2011, Wilson pleaded innocent to all charges. "Oh, yes, I've got to prove my innocence," Wilson, 78, said at the Clara Shortridge Foltz Criminal Justice Center when asked if she was going forward with the trial. "I wouldn't put my life savings … if I didn't believe in my innocence. It's all a crock." In May 2011 she was convicted  on six felony counts. She was sentenced on June 23, 2011, to four years in state prison and to pay more than $10,000 in restitution to the developer. She was released under an Alternative Custody Program in 2013.

Former candidate Scott Carwile, Wilson's protege, pleaded guilty to felony perjury and was granted probation in exchange for testifying against Wilson.

As of August 2014, all persons sentenced to imprisonment in the Temple City Affair have been released.

Demographics

2020
According to the 2020 United States census, Temple City had a population of 36,494.

2010
The 2010 United States Census reported that Temple City had a population of 35,558. The racial makeup of Temple City was 11,941 (33.6%) White (22.8% Non-Hispanic White), 283 (0.8%) African American, 150 (0.4%) Native American, 19,803 (55.7%) Asian, 31 (0.1%) Pacific Islander, 2,316 (6.5%) from other races, and 1,034 (2.9%) from two or more races. Hispanic or Latino of any race were 6,853 persons (19.3%).

The census reported that 35,136 people (98.8% of the population) lived in households, 29 (0.1%) lived in non-institutionalized group quarters, and 393 (1.1%) were institutionalized.

There were 11,606 households, out of which 4,402 (37.9%) had children under the age of 18 living in them, 6,605 (56.9%) were opposite-sex married couples living together, 1,714 (14.8%) had a female householder with no husband present, 686 (5.9%) had a male householder with no wife present.  There were 404 (3.5%) unmarried opposite-sex partnerships, and 65 (0.6%) same-sex married couples or partnerships. 1,973 households (17.0%) were made up of individuals, and 844 (7.3%) had someone living alone who was 65 years of age or older. The average household size was 3.03.  There were 9,005 families (77.6% of all households); the average family size was 3.39.

The population was spread out, with 7,549 people (21.2%) under the age of 18, 2,887 people (8.1%) aged 18 to 24, 8,983 people (25.3%) aged 25 to 44, 10,778 people (30.3%) aged 45 to 64, and 5,361 people (15.1%) who were 65 years of age or older.  The median age was 42.0 years. For every 100 females, there were 90.5 males.  For every 100 females age 18 and over, there were 87.1 males.

The homeowner vacancy rate was 0.7%; the rental vacancy rate was 5.2%.  23,213 people (65.3% of the population) lived in owner-occupied housing units and 11,923 people (33.5%) lived in rental housing units.

According to the 2010 United States Census, Temple City had a median household income of $97,082, with 5.9% of the population living below the federal poverty line.

Geography

Government

Local Government 
The City Council of Temple City has five members. They are each elected by citizens for four-year term and at-large instead of geographical district. The City Council elections are held during the California Primary election starting with the 2020 election. As a legislative body, it is the duty of the council to make the laws and establish policy. In March, the city council appoints one of its members to act as Mayor and one as Mayor Pro Tempore for a 1-year term. The Mayor presides over the council meetings and represents the city at civic functions. The Mayor Pro Tempore serves in the mayor's absence.

The current city council members are:
 Mayor: Tom Chavez 
 Mayor Pro Tem: Vincent Yu 
 Council members: Cynthia Sternquist, William Man, and Fernando Vizcarra.

List of mayors 
This is a list of Temple City mayors by year.
 1960 Merrill Fitzjohn
 2007 First mayor of Chinese ancestry.
 2009  
 2011 Tom Chavez
 2013 Cynthia Sternquist 
 2014 Carl Blum 
 2015 Tom Chavez 
 2017-2018 Cynthia Sternquist 
 2018-2019 William Man 
 2019-2020 Nanette Fish

State and federal 

The Los Angeles County Department of Health Services operates the Monrovia Health Center in Monrovia, serving Temple City.

Infrastructure 
Fire protection in Temple City is provided by the Los Angeles County Fire Department. The Los Angeles County Sheriff's Department (LASD) operates the Temple Station in Temple City.

Of interest

Of notable interest is that even though the chain no longer has a store within city limits, Winchell's Donuts originated in Temple City, opening on October 8, 1948.  In addition, in the 1970s, Temple City was home to Pete & Jake's Hot Rod Repair, noted for custom cars, such as The California Kid.

A Beijing-based restaurant group established its first North American branch Bistro Na's at a strip mall in late 2016. The restaurant earned its first Michelin star in June 2019.

Temple City Library
A mural was mounted on the west exterior wall of the remodeled Temple City Library in the summer of 2011. The mural, which was painted by more than 20 Temple City students under the tutelage of West Los Angeles-based muralist Art Mortimer, is the first project of the city's public art advisory group formed in February.  The creation of the 8-foot high, 28-foot wide mural was a partnership between the city, the advisory group, Los Angeles County and the Temple City Unified School District and designed by Temple City High school students.  It shows famous authors, and is an "interesting and unique way of showing what's inside the library," Mortimer said.  Further stating that  "The way they depict famous writers throughout history, the things they put in the background, such as books with wings, and their ways of showing the importance of the library in the community was very charming the way they did it."

Events

Camellia Festival
History: In 1944 a contest held by the Woman's Club of Temple City brought forth a slogan "Temple City, Home of Camellias", from which stemmed the annual Camellia Festival.
It was in recognition of the significance of family life  that the Camellia Festival was founded. The festival, which has attracted national recognition in ensuing years, is sponsored by the City of Temple City. Its purpose is to encourage every youngster in the community to belong to one of recognized youth organizations and to participate in the affairs of their community.
Only members of recognized organizations are  eligible to enter the Camellia Festival Parade.  The Royalty Coronation of two first graders is held the first Friday of February.

The annual Temple City Camellia Festival takes place the last weekend in February. A parade begins the celebration on Saturday morning. The parade commences at the corner of  Las Tunas Drive and Rosemead Blvd.  Commercial floats are not allowed in the parade,  all work is done by the youth and carry the theme of the year.   A carnival is part of the three-day festivities, where the public may enjoy the hometown atmosphere in Temple City Park, while they participate in games booths and food booths, manned by local service and youth organizations. Varied Cultural entertainment events are open to the community and welcomed guests.

What began in 1944 started by the Women's Club of Temple City as a small parade of youngsters who tossed camellia blossoms to parade watchers, has now become a signature event in Temple City attracting an estimated 5000 children and more than 20,000 visitors to Temple City each year.
The Camellia Festival is held on the last weekend in February which is only a part of the three-day festival. A carnival in Temple City Park as well as an Art show.

Parish Fiesta
The annual Saint Luke's Parish Fiestal takes place at the St. Luke the Evangelist Catholic Church in April. Located at Broadway and Cloverly Avenue, for three days, game booths, rides and food stalls are open to the community. Today, approximately 900 volunteers, young and old, work in the food and game booths throughout the weekend.  Many of the volunteers worked when the first bazaars began more than 50 years ago.  Every year, approximately 10,000 people enjoy the good food, rides, and entertainment throughout the weekend.

Farmers Market
The Temple City's Farmer's Market is open every Sunday from 8:30 a.m. to 12:30 p.m. at the parking lot between City Hall and Temple City Park.

Education 
Most of Temple City is served by the Temple City Unified School District (TCUSD), although a significant portion of the resident students attend schools in Arcadia Unified School District and some attend school within the El Monte City School District. The Temple City Unified School District consists of seven schools, including La Rosa, Cloverly, Emperor, and Longden Elementary Schools; Oak Avenue Intermediate School; Temple City High School; and the Doug Sears Learning Center.

Cleminson Elementary School is physically located within the city limits of Temple City but is actually part of the El Monte City School District. Additionally, Emperor Elementary School, while part of the Temple City Unified School District, is physically located within an unincorporated region of Los Angeles County and carries a San Gabriel postal address.

The Temple City Board of Education proclaims their district as "A District of Distinguished Schools" because every school in the Temple City district has been designated a "distinguished school" by the state of California, at some time. This honor indicates that Temple City Schools are in a higher percentile in categories such as academics, deportment and other scholastic activities. Temple City High School was ranked #209 in the America's Best High Schools in Newsweek's rankings in 2011.

Saint Luke's Parish School, grades K–8, is located on the grounds of Saint Luke the Evangelist Church, at Broadway and Cloverly.  Committed to providing a quality Catholic education, it was founded in 1947. Temporary structures, which were formerly army barracks donated from a parish in North Hollywood housed the new school. A permanent school was opened in 1956 and by 1958 sixteen classrooms were completed.

Notable people 
 Clyde Beck, (1900-1988) - was a infielder in Major League Baseball for the Chicago Cubs and Cincinnati Reds from 1926 to 1931.
 Richard Drew, (b 1946) is an Associated Press photo-journalist. who photographed The Falling Man.
 Hal Finney and Dorian Nakamoto, suspected identities of Satoshi Nakamoto.
 David Klein,(b 1946) is a inventor of the Jelly Belly brand. In 1976, he was living in Temple City when he came up with the idea for the new candy company.
 Xpecial, (b 1992) - is a well-known professional gamer in the North American League of Legends.

Sister cities

Temple City currently has Sister City relations with the following places:

 City of Hawkesbury, Australia (Since 1984)
Magdalena de Kino, Sonora, Mexico

See also

References

External links
 

 
Cities in Los Angeles County, California
Communities in the San Gabriel Valley
Incorporated cities and towns in California